Oliver Cromwell's House in Ely, Cambridgeshire, England was the family home of Oliver Cromwell. The kitchen dates from around 1215, other parts being built later. The house was the vicarage of St Mary's Church (which is adjacent to it) until 1986. In 1988 it was bought by the City of Ely Council and was opened as a tourist attraction in 1990, and has been refurbished to show how it may have looked during Cromwell's lifetime.

The former Lord Protector's family home is his only residence still in existence other than Hampton Court. Following a recent refurbishment the House now has a completely re-vamped Civil War exhibition with interactive displays and interpretations.

References

External links

Listed buildings in Cambridgeshire
Ely, Cambridgeshire
House
Timber framed buildings in England